Museum of the Rockies is a museum in Bozeman, Montana. Originally affiliated with Montana State University in Bozeman, and now also, the Smithsonian Institution. The museum is largely known for its Paleontological collections as well as having the largest collection of North American Dinosaur fossils in the United States.  They also possess the largest Tyrannosaurus skull ever discovered, as well as the thigh bone of a Tyrannosaurus Rex that contains soft-tissue remains. The museum is part of the Montana Dinosaur Trail and is Montana's official repository for Paleontological specimens.

The museum's collections focus on the physical and cultural history of the Rocky Mountains and the people and animals who have lived there, and date back more than 500 million years.

Overview

Museum of the Rockies preserves and tells the stories of Montana and the Northern Rockies, educating visitors about the region's rich history, which includes its Paleontological roots. The museum was founded in 1957, funded in part by a gift from Caroline M. McGill. The museum's collection has grown to include 300,000 objects that cover over 500,000,000 years of history. In 1980, the museum acquired over 10,000 photographs and negatives from the heirs of Albert, Alfred and Chris Schlechten (now known as the Schlechten collection). These photographs chronicle the Bozeman and Yellowstone National Park areas over two generations (from about 1905 until the late 1970s).

The museum offers symposiums, allowing Native Americans whose tribes called the region home to share their oral histories with visitors. In 2005, the museum became an affiliate of the Smithsonian Institution, which provided the museum greater access to the collections and programs of that institute.

Traveling exhibits that visit the museum have covered topics such as African American art, television and film costumes, the impact of weapons on the cultures of the Rocky Mountains, and King Tut.

At the Museum

Tinsley House

The Tinsley House is preserved by the Museum of the Rockies as a living history museum. The 100+ year-old house was originally located in Willow Creek and it was moved to its present site (on more than ) in front of the museum in 1989. At the museum, visitors can learn about the life of the Tinsleys and others who lived at the time. Children can try on clothes and play with contemporary toys of the time. The house includes a functioning outhouse, water pump and kitchen where food typical of the time is sometimes prepared.

The Tinsleys migrated west during the American Civil War. William and Lucy [Nave] Tinsley met in Virginia City, Montana, where both worked. They relocated to the Gallatin Valley after they married. The Tinsleys built their house in 1889 when the original cabin became too small to accommodate their growing family. The house provides an overview of homestead life in the 1800s in the Gallatin Valley. The house was constructed of logs accumulated over the course of two years from the Tobacco Root Mountains. Many of the interior items are believed to have been ordered from the Sears catalog. Most items in the house have been donated by Tinsley descendants.

Paleontology

While not its sole focus, the museum is primarily known for its paleontological collections. However, this was not always the case as specimens found in Montana were usually taken out of state to other museums. This changed in 1990 with the discovery of a Tyrannosaurus Rex skeleton that would remain in Montana and be exhibited at the museum.

While fossils continue to be the property of the federal government, the museum has been able to increase its collection (due in part to Curator Jack Horner's agreement and work with the United States Fish and Wildlife Service and the Federal Bureau of Land Management). The museum is now home to 13 Tyrannosaurus Rex specimens, including one of only two complete skeletons that have ever been found.

Apart from housing one of the largest collections of dinosaur fossils in the world and the largest in the United States, the museum is also home to one of the world's largest Tyrannosaurus skulls (MOR 008) – narrowly surpassing that of the Chicago Field Museum's specimen, Sue. The museum's Siebel Dinosaur Complex is home to one of the first identified female dinosaurs, an ovulating T. rex. Curator Horner, who served as an adviser to the Jurassic Park films, was one of the lead scientists involved in the 2005 discovery of soft tissue remains in the thigh bone of a Tyrannosaurus, which were later brought to the museum. The museum has also been involved in a number of other finds, including a baby Triceratops in Jordan, Montana, in 2006, and "Yoshi's Trike" (MOR 3027), a large Triceratops specimen with 125 cm long horns, discovered in 2010.

In June 2008, the museum formed part of a consortium that obtained a mobile paleontology lab that would assist researchers, allowing them to chemically analyze fossils while still in the field in order to help prevent degradation.

The department will also add three research staff, who will be housed in the basement, bringing the total number of researchers to eight by some time in late 2018.

Curatorial Center for the Humanities
On April 28, 2016, the museum broke ground on a new $4 million,  Curatorial Center for the Humanities (CCH). The new building will provide storage and curatorial space for the museum's humanities collection, which includes art, archaeological, historic, Native American, and photographic items. About  of the building will be devoted to storage space, with the remaining  containing office and work space. Private donations paid for the entire cost of the structure, which meant that no state funds were used. Slate Architecture of Helena designed the structure. Bill Walker was the lead architect. Civil and structural engineering, as well as planning for the electrical system, mechanical system, and plumbing were provided by Morrison Maierle, Inc., of Bozeman. The general contractor was Jackson Contractor Group of Bozeman.

Curators at MOR began cataloging all the humanities items in storage in 2015.

Construction on the building is expected to be complete June 2017. Humanities items currently on display and in storage will then be taken to the CCH for conservation and restoration. Moving the items is expected to take another year.

MOR officials said that the history hall exhibits will be completely revamped after the move to the CCH is completed.

Education 
Students from all over Montana can engage in school tours, homeschool programs, summer camps, and educational classes & lectures at the museum. There are even classes from Montana State University that undergraduates can take, including Undergrad Research. Museum Practices, Undergrad Research & Instruction, and an Independent study with the institution.

References

External links

 Museum of the Rockies official website

History museums in Montana
Living museums in Montana
Montana State University
Institutions accredited by the American Alliance of Museums
Museums in Bozeman, Montana
Native American museums in Montana
Natural history museums in Montana
Planetaria in the United States
University museums in Montana
Dinosaur museums in the United States
Smithsonian Institution affiliates
Museums established in 1957
1957 establishments in Montana
Paleontology in Montana
Science museums in Montana
Hell Creek Formation